Charter of Saint Petersburg is the basic law of the federal city of Saint Petersburg. It was adopted by the Legislative Assembly of Saint Petersburg, the city's unicameral parliament, on January 14, 1998.

History
Charter of Saint Petersburg was developed and adopted by deputies of the Legislative Assembly of the first convocation (1994–1998). The document was adopted in the second vote by qualified majority in the minimum number of votes: 34 of 50 (8 votes against and 3 abstentions). Since the Charter in this edition significantly infringe upon the authority of the Governor of St. Petersburg and gave a certain imbalance in favor of the legislative branch power, the then Governor Vladimir Yakovlev, refused to sign it, which led to a serious political crisis. As a result of negotiation and compromise is January 28, 1998 has adopted a package of amendments in favor of the executive.

Structure
St. Petersburg Charter consists of a preamble and 12 chapters:

Chapter I. General Provisions
Chapter II. Competences of St. Petersburg
Chapter III. Basics territorial system of St. Petersburg
Chapter IV. Fundamentals of organization of the government of St. Petersburg
Chapter V. The Legislature St. Petersburg
Chapter VI. Administration of St. Petersburg
Chapter VII. The judiciary St. Petersburg
Chapter VIII. Interaction authorities of St. Petersburg
Chapter IX. Basis of local government in St. Petersburg
Chapter X. The participation of residents of St. Petersburg in the exercise of power
Chapter XI. Ownership of St. Petersburg
Chapter XII. Final and transitional provisions

External links

References

Constitutions and charters of federal subjects of Russia
1998 in law
Saint Petersburg
1998 documents